Damaturu is a Local Government Area and the capital city of Yobe State in northern Nigeria. It is the headquarters of the Damaturu Emirate.

History
Damaturu came into existence as a colony when it was carved out of the Alagarno district by the British. It resulted in the conquest of the Bornu Empire in 1902 by colonial forces under the command of Colonel Thomas Morland.

Boko Haram
Damaturu has been attacked many times by Boko Haram jihadist insurgents in their violent campaign to establish a caliphate in the northeast.

In November 2011, they killed over 100 people in a series of attacks.

In December 2011, they carried out two bombings.

In June 2012, 40 insurgents broke into a prison. 40 inmates escaped and eight people were killed.

In June 2013, insurgents attacked a school and killed thirteen people, including students and teachers.

In October 2013, militants engaged security forces in a lengthy gun battle and raided a hospital.

In December 2014, militants carried out attacks again. Gunshots and explosions were heard and a base of the riot police was reported to have been set on fire. Yobe State University also came under attack.

In February 2015, a teenage female suicide bomber killed 16 people at a bus station.

In February 2020, a massacre occurred in Auno on the Damaturu-Maiduguri highway. Insurgents killed 30 commuters, burned vehicles and kidnapped people.

Geography
The postal code of the area is 620. The Local Government Area has an area of 2,366 km and a population of 88,014 at the 2006 census.

The town of Damaturu is on the A3 highway and in 2010 had an estimated population of 44,268.

The northeasterly line of equal latitude and longitude passes through the area, including  in the north.

See also 
 List of Local Government Areas in Yobe State

References

 
Populated places in Yobe State
Local Government Areas in Yobe State
State capitals in Nigeria